The 1970–71 Connecticut Huskies men's basketball team represented the University of Connecticut in the 1970–71 collegiate men's basketball season. The Huskies completed the season with a 10–14 overall record. The Huskies were members of the Yankee Conference, where they ended the season with a 5–5 record. The Huskies played their home games at Hugh S. Greer Field House in Storrs, Connecticut, and were led by second-year head coach Dee Rowe.

Schedule 

|-
!colspan=12 style=""| Regular Season

Schedule Source:

References 

UConn Huskies men's basketball seasons
Connecticut
1970 in sports in Connecticut
1971 in sports in Connecticut